Miss Thriftway was an unlimited hydroplane in the 1950s and 1960s.

Ted Bowhay was the Seattle owner of the Miss Thriftway in the early 1960s.  He was also known for having owned & raced the limited Hydroplane "Redskin."

With Bill Muncey driving, the boat won the 1956 and 1957 American Power Boat Association Gold Cup.

References

Hydroplanes